Power Struggle (2012) was a professional wrestling pay-per-view (PPV) event promoted by New Japan Pro-Wrestling (NJPW). The event took place on November 11, 2012, in Osaka, Osaka, at the Bodymaker Colosseum and featured nine matches, five of which were contested for championships. It was the second event under the Power Struggle name.

Production

Background
Following the success of King of Pro-Wrestling, the first NJPW pay-per-view (PPV) available on the international market, the promotion's chairman Takaaki Kidani announced that Power Struggle would also air worldwide on PPV.

Storylines
Power Struggle featured nine professional wrestling matches that involved different wrestlers from pre-existing scripted feuds and storylines. Wrestlers portrayed villains, heroes, or less distinguishable characters in the scripted events that built tension and culminated in a wrestling match or series of matches.

Event
During the event both of NJPW's junior heavyweight titles changed hands; Time Splitters (Alex Shelley and Kushida), winners of the 2012 Super Jr. Tag Tournament, captured the IWGP Junior Heavyweight Tag Team Championship from the Forever Hooligans (Alex Koslov and Rocky Romero), while Prince Devitt regained the IWGP Junior Heavyweight Championship from Low Ki. Meanwhile, K.E.S. (Davey Boy Smith Jr. and Lance Archer) successfully defended the IWGP Tag Team Championship against previous champions Tencozy (Hiroyoshi Tenzan and Satoshi Kojima), and Shinsuke Nakamura successfully defended the IWGP Intercontinental Championship against Karl Anderson, after which he nominated Kazushi Sakuraba his challenger for Wrestle Kingdom 7 in Tokyo Dome. The event also saw Kazuchika Okada retain his IWGP Heavyweight Championship certificate against Hirooki Goto, while Hiroshi Tanahashi retained the title itself against Yujiro Takahashi, setting up the main event between the two for Wrestle Kingdom 7 in Tokyo Dome.

Results

References

External links
The official New Japan Pro-Wrestling website

2012
2012 in professional wrestling
November 2012 events in Japan
Professional wrestling in Osaka
Events in Osaka